Jader Andrés Valencia Mena (born 15 November 1999) is a Colombian professional footballer who plays as forward for French Ligue 1 club RC Lens, on loan from Millonarios.

Career

Valencia started his career with Bogotá.

References

1999 births
Living people
People from Sincelejo
Association football forwards
Colombian footballers
Colombian expatriate footballers
Categoría Primera A players
Categoría Primera B players
Championnat National 2 players
Millonarios F.C. players
RC Lens players
Colombian expatriate sportspeople in France
Expatriate footballers in France